Repište may refer to:

Repište, Belgrade, an urban neighborhood
Repište, Slovakia, municipality in Žiar nad Hronom, Slovakia
Repište, Vladičin Han, settlement in Vladičin Han, Serbia